Bob Gunther (born July 12, 1943) is a Minnesota politician and former member of the Minnesota House of Representatives. A member of the Republican Party of Minnesota, he represented the 23A district, which includes all or portions of Blue Earth, Faribault, Jackson, Martin and Watonwan counties.

Early life and education
Gunther was born in Sioux City, Iowa, and graduated from Fairmont High School in Fairmont. He served in the United States Navy until age 26, then earned a Bachelor of Science degree in marketing from Saint Cloud State University.

Carer 
Gunther co-owned Gunther's Foods in Fairmont and Elmore.

Gunther was first elected to the Minnesota House of Representatives as a Republican in 1995 in a special election held after Representative Gene Hugoson was appointed Minnesota commissioner of agriculture. He served until 2021, after not seeking reelection in 2020.

Until redistricting in 2002, Gunther represented the old 26A district.

Personal life
Gunther is married to Nancy, and they have one child. He is a member of the Bethel Evangelical Free Church. He enjoys reading Louis L’Amour and Robert Ludlum.

References

External links

 Rep. Gunther Web Page
 Minnesota Public Radio Votetracker: Rep. Bob Gunther
 Project Votesmart: Rep. Bob Gunther Profile
 Vance, Daniel J. "Mr. Whipple goes to St. Paul."  Connect Business Magazine

1943 births
Living people
People from Fairmont, Minnesota
Republican Party members of the Minnesota House of Representatives
Members of the Evangelical Free Church of America
21st-century American politicians